Boadicea is a genus of moths in the subfamily Arctiinae.

Species
Boadicea flavimacula Pinhey, 1968
Boadicea pelecoides Tams, 1930

References

Natural History Museum Lepidoptera generic names catalog

Lithosiini
Moths of Sub-Saharan Africa